James Alston Paxton (born November 6, 1988), nicknamed "The Big Maple", is a Canadian professional baseball pitcher for the Boston Red Sox of Major League Baseball (MLB). He previously played in MLB for the Seattle Mariners and New York Yankees. 

Paxton played college baseball for the Kentucky Wildcats. He was drafted in the fourth round of the 2010 MLB draft by the Mariners and made his MLB debut for them in 2013. On May 8, 2018, Paxton pitched a no-hitter against the Toronto Blue Jays, becoming the first Canadian major league pitcher to throw a no-hitter in Canada. Following the 2018 season, Paxton was traded to the Yankees.

Amateur career

North Delta Blue Jays
Paxton attended Delta Secondary School in Ladner, British Columbia. He played for the North Delta Blue Jays of the British Columbia Premier Baseball League (PBL) and for Team Canada at the Junior National level. In his junior year, Paxton won 10 games and had a 1.51 earned run average (ERA) to go along with 100 strikeouts in 78 innings pitched. This led to him being named the top pitcher of the PBL and a first-team All-Star. After starting his senior year injured, Paxton finished the year with a 7–1 win–loss record and 65 strikeouts and 32 walks in 50 innings pitched. Both years Paxton and the Blue Jays won the league title and the B.C.'s Best Tournament.

University of Kentucky
After graduating from high school in 2006, Paxton attended the University of Kentucky, where he played college baseball for the Kentucky Wildcats baseball team in the Southeastern Conference (SEC). As a freshman, he led the Wildcats in appearances with 25 and had a 2–0 record in relief with one save.

In 2008 as a sophomore, Paxton worked his way into the starting rotation midway through the season and earned 11 starts while making 17 appearances. He finished the year 4–2 with a 2.92 ERA. That same year Paxton pitched a complete-game shutout over Ole Miss to win the SEC Tournament earning him SEC Pitcher of the Week. Due to injury, he did not participate in the NCAA Tournament. That summer Paxton was invited to play collegiate summer baseball in the Alaska Baseball League where he pitched in four games with three starts, finishing with a 1–0 record and a 2.25 ERA in 16 innings. He struck out 12 batters and allowed opponents to hit just .179 against him.

Paxton started 13 games in 2009, finishing 5–3 with 115 strikeouts (5th best in school history) in  innings. He drew the attention of Major League Baseball scouts as he was considered a possible first-round draft pick. Paxton was drafted by the Toronto Blue Jays in the first round (37th overall) of the 2009 Major League Baseball Draft. However, he did not sign with the Blue Jays opting to return to Kentucky for his senior season; the NCAA subsequently ruled him ineligible, stemming from his contract with agent Scott Boras.

Paxton was named to the SEC Academic Honor Roll every year he was at Kentucky. He held a 3.3 GPA heading into his senior year as an accounting major.

Professional career

Grand Prairie AirHogs
After being ruled ineligible to return to Kentucky, Paxton signed with the Grand Prairie AirHogs in the independent American Association in 2010. There, he went 1–2 with a 4.08 ERA and striking out 18 batters in  innings.

Seattle Mariners
In June 2010, Paxton was drafted by the Seattle Mariners in the fourth round of the 2010 Major League Baseball Draft. He signed with the Mariners on March 4, 2011. In the 2011 season, Paxton played for Single A Clinton LumberKings and the Double A Jackson Generals of the Southern League. He finished with a 6–3 win–loss record, 2.37 ERA, 131 strikeouts, and 43 walks in 95 innings pitched, while allowing an opposing batting average of .215. Paxton, along with Alex Liddi, represented the Mariners at the 2011 All-Star Futures Game. Paxton was invited to attend the Mariners' main spring training camp in 2012, but did not make the opening day roster. He was sent to the Jackson Generals.

In 2013, Paxton played for the Tacoma Rainiers of the Class AAA Pacific Coast League. With the Mariners' coaching staff, he worked to change his pitching mechanics to mirror that of Clayton Kershaw, resulting in an improvement in his performance. On September 3, 2013, Paxton was promoted to the major leagues. His first major league appearance came on September 7 when he started against the Tampa Bay Rays. He earned the win as the Mariners won 6–2. Paxton finished with a 3–0 record in 4 starts.

Paxton began the 2014 season in the Mariners rotation, but after his first start of the season, he was placed on the disabled list. He would finish the season appearing in only 13 starts due to an extended stint on the disabled list. His injury woes would continue into the 2015 season, during which he would appear in only 13 starts for the second consecutive season. In 2016, Paxton was in competition for a rotation spot in spring training, but after posting an ERA of over 9, he was optioned to AAA. He was recalled a few months later after Félix Hernández landed on the disabled list.

Paxton started the 2017 season for the Mariners with 0.00 ERA over his first three starts. He won the American League Player of the Week Award for April 10–16 after pitching a combined 15 scoreless innings in two wins. On May 5, 2017, Paxton was placed on the 10-day disabled list due to a left forearm strain. Paxton pitched exceedingly well in July, going 6–0. He and Adrián Beltré were the co-winners of the American League Player of the Week Award for July 24–30, and he was also the AL Pitcher of the Month for July. However, on August 10, Paxton strained his left pectoral muscle pitching against the LA Angels, putting him on the disabled list once again. He tied for the major league lead in wild pitches, with 15.

In 2018, before his start against the Minnesota Twins, Paxton gained national media attention when a bald eagle, which had been participating in a patriotic pre-game ceremony, flew around and landed on Paxton. Paxton, who reacted calmly, later stated, "No, I wasn't going to run. I figured I'm not going to outrun an eagle, so I might as well see what happens." On May 2, 2018, against the Oakland Athletics, Paxton struck out a career-high 16 batters, but the bullpen behind him faltered, and the Mariners lost 3–2.

On May 8, 2018, Paxton threw a no-hitter against the Toronto Blue Jays at Rogers Centre. He threw 99 pitches while issuing three walks in a 5–0 victory, becoming the second Canadian to throw a no-hitter (the first was Dick Fowler of the Philadelphia Athletics, pitching against the St. Louis Browns on September 9, 1945). He is also the first Canadian Major League pitcher to throw a no-hitter in Canada, and the first Seattle Mariners pitcher to throw a no-hitter in a road game. He was placed on the disabled list on July 13, 2018, with a back injury. He finished the season 11–6 with a 3.76 ERA.

New York Yankees

On November 19, 2018, the Mariners traded Paxton to the New York Yankees for Justus Sheffield, Dom Thompson-Williams, and Erik Swanson. In April 2019, Paxton became only the second Yankees pitcher (after David Cone in 1998) to strike out 12 or more batters in consecutive starts. In 2019 he was 15-6 with a 3.82 ERA in 29 starts, in which he struck out 186 batters in 150.2 innings (11.1 strikeouts per 9 innings).

On February 5, 2020, it was revealed that Paxton underwent a microscopic lumbar discectomy to remove a peridiscal cyst. Recovery time required 3–4 months.

Paxton made 5 appearances in 2020 for the Yankees, pitching to a 1-1 record with a 6.64 ERA and 26 strikeouts over 20.1 innings pitched. He became a free agent after the season.

Seattle Mariners (second stint)
On February 18, 2021, Paxton agreed to a one-year, $8.5 million contract with the Seattle Mariners. In his first start of the season on April 6, 2021 against the Chicago White Sox, Paxton threw only 24 pitches before being removed from the game with left elbow discomfort. Two days later on April 8, it was announced that Tommy John surgery was recommended for Paxton. On April 13, the Mariners announced that Paxton would undergo the procedure, ending his season. He underwent the surgery in late April.

Boston Red Sox
On December 1, 2021, Paxton signed a one-year, $10 million contract with the Boston Red Sox that included a two-year club option. On March 16, 2022, the Red Sox placed Paxton on the 60-day injured list, as he continued his recovery from surgery. Paxton did not pitch for the Red Sox during the 2022 season. Following the season, the team announced that Paxton exercised his $4 million player option to remain a member of the Red Sox for the 2023 season.

Pitching style 
A power pitcher with a long stride and a  release from a closed position that hides most of his deliveries, comparable to a faster version of Andy Petitte, Paxton relies on a four-seam fastball that ranges in velocities in the high 90s miles per hour (MPH). He also complements his four-seam fastball with a cutter (high 80s MPH) and a knuckle curve (low 80s MPH). He has decreased the use of his sinker/changeup. His strikeout pitches are high fastballs and a low inside knuckle curve against right-handers. His increased usage of knuckle curves on the first pitch of at bats limited the number of hits and runs that he allowed during the end of the 2019 season. However, his glove position pre-pitch made it easy for a knuckle curve to be tipped, so he now puts the glove sideways while wriggling the ball and the glove.

Personal
Paxton and his wife, Katie, reside in Kirkland, Washington during the offseason.

See also
List of Major League Baseball no-hitters

References

External links

1988 births
Arkansas Travelers players
Baseball people from British Columbia
Canadian expatriate baseball players in the United States
Clinton LumberKings players
Everett AquaSox players
Grand Prairie AirHogs players
Jackson Generals (Southern League) players
Kentucky Wildcats baseball players
Living people
Major League Baseball pitchers
Major League Baseball players from Canada
New York Yankees players
People from Delta, British Columbia
Peoria Javelinas players
Seattle Mariners players
Tacoma Rainiers players
Anchorage Glacier Pilots players